McMicken Island Marine State Park is a public recreation area on Harstine Island in south Puget Sound, Mason County, Washington. A sand bar connects McMicken Island to Harstine Island at low tide. Park activities include hiking, boating, and harvesting shellfish. The park is administered as a satellite of Jarrell Cove State Park. It bears the name of William C. McMicken, who was Washington Surveyor General from 1873 to 1886.

References

External links
McMicken Island Marine State Park Washington State Parks and Recreation Commission

State parks of Washington (state)
Parks in Mason County, Washington